The University of North Dakota College of Arts and Science (A&S) is the liberal arts and sciences unit of the University of North Dakota in Grand Forks, North Dakota. The College of Arts and Sciences was established in 1883, and is the largest and oldest of nine colleges at the University, with over 200 regular faculty members in eighteen departments. The departments are organized into four divisions: fine arts, social sciences, humanities, and math-natural sciences. The college currently enrolls approximately 3,600 undergraduate students, about 34% of the University's total undergraduate enrollment. It offers thirty-one undergraduate majors, fifteen master's programs, and eleven doctoral programs. The college is headquartered in Columbia Hall.

History
 The College of Arts and Sciences dates from the founding of the University in 1883, and has had organic continuity from that date, in spite of some temporary changes in name and structure. The “Act for Establishing a Territorial University at Grand Forks” provided for a College of Arts “co-existent with” a College of Letters. In 1901 the name “College of Liberal Arts” was adopted, and retained until 1943, when “College of Science, Literature and Arts” was substituted. The latter name was kept until 1967. The President of the University served in effect as dean of the College until 1901, to be followed by George S. Thomas (1901-1911), Melvin A. Brannon (1911-1914), Vernon P. Squires (1914-1930), William G. Bek (1930-1948), Robert Bonner Witmer (1948-1965), and interim associate dean Philip A. Rognlie (1965–66). Bernard O’Kelly was dean from 1966 until his retirement in 1995 when he was succeeded by John Ettling (1995-1998). Albert Fivizzani served as interim dean (1998-2001) until Martha A. Potvin became dean (2001-2011). Kathy Tiemann served as interim dean from 2011 to 2013. In June 2013, Debbie Storrs was named the dean and held the position until 2018. Bradley Rundquist was named interim dean in July 2018 and permanent dean in July 2019.

The College includes 18 academic departments: Anthropology, Art and Design, Biology, Chemistry, Communication, Communication Sciences and Disorders, Criminal Justice, English, Geography & GISc, History & American Indian Studies, Mathematics, Modern & Classical Languages, Music, Philosophy & Religious Studies, Physics & Astrophysics, Psychology, Sociology, and Theatre Arts. The College also includes six special programs: Forensic Science, General Studies, Pre-Health, Interdisciplinary Health Studies, Women & Gender Studies, and Go Global Academy.

The College enrolls all undergraduates who wish to complete studies for the Bachelor of Arts, Bachelor of Fine Arts, Bachelor of Music or Bachelor of Science degree with concentration in some substantive or applicative field of study within the traditionally broad spectrum of the liberal arts.

About the College 
 Established in 1883
 over 200 faculty members in 18 departments
 4 divisions
 Enrolls 3,600 undergraduate students
 31 undergraduate majors
 15 master's programs
 11 doctoral programs

Notable Events 
 The UND Writers Conference, a literary conference that is free and open to the public.

Notable alumni

 Maxwell Anderson, playwright, author, poet, journalist and lyricist
 Sam Anderson, actor
 Dennis Bounds, anchor KING 5 News
 Tom Brosseau, singer songwriter
 Phil Jackson, professional basketball coach 
 Thomas McGrath, poet
 Michael Halstenson, musician and composer
 Jon Hassler, novelist
 Chuck Klosterman, author
 Irv Kupcinet, Chicago Sun-Times columnist; national syndicated talk show host; winner of 15 Emmy awards and a Peabody award.
 Shadoe Stevens, radio host, voiceover actor, and television personality
 Dave St. Peter, president of the Minnesota Twins
 Edward K. Thompson, former editor of LIFE magazine
 Era Bell Thompson, former editor of Ebony magazine
 Larry Watson, Milkweed National Fiction Prize-winning author

References

External links
UND College of Arts & Sciences 

Educational institutions established in 1883
1883 establishments in Dakota Territory
Liberal arts colleges at universities in the United States
University of North Dakota